The 2015–16 Florida Gulf Coast Eagles women's basketball team will represent Florida Gulf Coast University (FGCU) in the 2015–16 NCAA Division I women's basketball season. The Eagles, led by fourteenth year head coach Karl Smesko, played their home games at Alico Arena and were members of the Atlantic Sun Conference. They finish the season 33–6, 14–0 in A-Sun play to win the Atlantic Sun regular season title. They advanced to the championship game of the A-Sun women's tournament where they lost to Jacksonville. They received an automatic bid to the Women's National Invitation Tournament where they advanced to the championship game where they lost to South Dakota.

Media
All home games and conference road will be shown on ESPN3 or A-Sun.TV. Road games will also be broadcast on the FGCU Portal.

Roster

Schedule

|-
!colspan=9 style="background:#00885A; color:#00287A;"| Non-conference regular season

|-
!colspan=9 style="background:#00885A; color:#00287A;"| Atlantic Sun regular season

|-
!colspan=9 style="background:#00885A; color:#00287A;"| Atlantic Sun Women's Tournament

|-
!colspan=9 style="background:#00885A; color:#00287A;"| WNIT

Rankings

See also
 2015–16 Florida Gulf Coast Eagles men's basketball team

References

Florida Gulf Coast
Florida Gulf Coast Eagles women's basketball seasons
2016 Women's National Invitation Tournament participants